Polytechnic is a 2014 Indian Malayalam comedy film directed by M. Padmakumar and produced by Kala Nair. The film stars Kunchacko Boban and Bhavana in the lead roles. The music of the film was composed by Gopi Sundar. K N M & Percy Pictures distributed the film, it was released on 9 April 2014.

Plot
Pauly belongs to a well off family in a rural village of Kerala. A politician by profession, he does many helpful activities for the benefit of poor people in the village.
Sukumaran Nair, a  member of the opposition party, tries to disrupt whatever Pauly does. They have been enemies for a very long time. Things become worse when Pauly falls in love with Sukumaran Nair's daughter Aswathy.
It is at this circumstance, Pauly's father, an army person is killed in a terrorist attack. Pauly is forced to look after his family.  Following the advice of a senior comrade Ganghadaran in the party, Pauly buys a biscuit company in his village with the help of three close friends using compensation money from the government, for the loss of his father. His plan is to convert it into a factory to store processed and dried agricultural products.
The inauguration of the factory is disrupted by the Panchayath secretary, stating that the factory does not have the required approvals. Pauly tries to get the required approvals, but nothing works out. Bekkar plays friend tries to get him the approval by paying a man who promised to get them the required approvals. Turns out that the certificates given to them are fake and Pauly gets arrested. When released from jail Pauly rejects an offer to buy the land from him. He bribes all the officers and gets all the required approvals.
Pauly and his friends catch a group of goons trying to burn the factory. They capture one of the attackers. They recognize him as the same person who got them in jail by giving them fake certificates. He confesses that the conspirator is Ganghadharan. The panchayath secretary gives the signature so that Pauly does not cause any trouble.
During the inauguration of the factory, Pauly plays a video clip of the bribes given to all the officers in front of the minister. The movie ends with the minister congratulating Pauly and his friends.

Cast
 
Kunchacko Boban as Pauly
Aju Varghese as Bakkar, Pauly's best friend
Bhavana as Aswathi Nair, Pauly's love interest and Sub Inspector of Police
Vijayaraghavan as Sukumaran Nair, Aswathi's father and Pauly's arch enemy
Kochu Preman as Sukumaran's aide
Kalabhavan Narayanankutty 
Suraj Venjaramoodu as Sakhav Che. local leader
Niyas Backer as Murugan
Zahid Sinan
Devi Chandana
Sunil Sukhada as Panicker, the local astrologer
Mamukkoya as Habeeb, Bakkar's father and a local tea vendor
Ambika as Mary, Pauly's mother
Nebish Benson
Anil Murali as Ganeshan, Police officer 
Ponnamma Babu as Lathika, health department officer 
Sasi Kalinga as Kannan, officer
Edavela Babu as Poly's uncle
Thesni Khan as panchayath secretary 
Hareesh Peradi as Sakhav, local leader
Guinness Pakru
Dr Rony David as Pauly and Bakkar's childhood friend
Innocent as Chandrakumar, minister

Soundtrack
The music was composed by Gopi Sundar, with lyrics written by Rajeev Nair.

References

External links
 

Films directed by M. Padmakumar
Indian romantic comedy films
2014 romantic comedy films
Films scored by Gopi Sundar
2010s Malayalam-language films